Arnold Oldsworth (born 1561) was an English lawyer and politician who sat in the House of Commons at various times between 1593 and 1611.

Oldsworth was  the eldest son of Edward Oldsworth and his wife Tacy Porter, daughter of Arthur Porter. He was educated  under Alexander Nowell, dean of St. Paul's and matriculated at Magdalen Hall, Oxford under date 7 July 1575, aged 17. He was at Thavies Inn and was a student of Lincoln's Inn in 1580. In 1593 he was elected Member of Parliament for Tregoney.  He  was keeper of the Hanaper in Chancery, and Receiver of the Fines in the King's Bench. In 1604, he was elected MP for Cirencester. He was chosen an Associate to the Bench of Lincoln's Inn on 16 June 1612. He was of Bradley, Gloucestershire and lived in St. Martin's Lane, London. He and his wife had a grant of lands in Brenchley and elsewhere in Kent on 29 March 1616. He was an antiquarian.
 
Oldsworth married Lucy Barty daughter of Francis Barty, a native of Antwerp. His son Michael was also an  MP.

References

1561 births
Year of death missing
Members of the pre-1707 English Parliament for constituencies in Cornwall
Members of Lincoln's Inn
Alumni of Magdalen Hall, Oxford
16th-century English lawyers
17th-century English lawyers
English MPs 1593
English MPs 1604–1611